Sabeti is a surname of Persian origin. Notable people with the surname include:

Mehdi Sabeti (born 1975), Iranian football player 
Pardis Sabeti (born 1975), Iranian American scientist
Parviz Sabeti (born 1936), Iranian jurist

Surnames of Iranian origin